"Strangers on a Train" is a song recorded by Australian rock band The Sports. The song was written by band member Martin Armiger. Released in January 1980 as the lead single from the band's third studio album, Suddenly (1980), the song peaked at number 22 on the Australian Kent Music Report.

Track listing
 Australian 7" single (K 7767)
Side A "Strangers on a Train" - 2:38
Side B "Can't Ever Decide"  (live at Bombay Rock)  - 3:38

Charts

References

1979 songs
1980 singles
The Sports songs
Mushroom Records singles
Songs written by Martin Armiger